Chaudhary Nakli Singh  is an Indian politician and was Member of Parliament in the 11th and 12th Lok Sabhas of India. Singh represented the Saharanpur constituency of Uttar Pradesh and is a member of the Bharatiya Janata Party political party.

Early life and education
Nakli Singh, who belonged to the Gurjar/Gujjar community, was born in the village Jandhera Samaspur which is in Saharanpur district, UP. He attained B.Sc. (Agriculture) degree and subsequently completed his M.A. (Economics). He is also the founder of Sardar Vallabhbhai Patel High School in his village.

Political life
Apart from being a Member of Parliament, Singh was a member of several committees and has also held several party positions in the BJP. He was the President of BJP of Saharanpur district; Member, National Council of BJP and Vice President of Kisan Morcha, BJP, UP.

Posts held

See also

11th Lok Sabha
12th Lok Sabha
Politics of India
Parliament of India
Government of India
Saharanpur (Lok Sabha constituency)
Bharatiya Janata Party

References 

India MPs 1996–1997
India MPs 1998–1999
1943 births
Bharatiya Janata Party politicians from Uttar Pradesh
People from Saharanpur district
Lok Sabha members from Uttar Pradesh
People from Saharanpur
Living people